James Peter Speid Jamieson  (9 February 1880 – 18 January 1963) was a New Zealand medical doctor and political lobbyist. He was born in Cruisdale near Sandness in the Shetland islands of Scotland on 9 February 1880.

In the 1956 Queen's Birthday Honours, Jamieson was appointed a Commander of the Order of the British Empire, in recognition of his services as a medical practitioner.

References

1880 births
1963 deaths
20th-century New Zealand politicians
20th-century New Zealand medical doctors
People from Shetland
Scottish emigrants to New Zealand
New Zealand Commanders of the Order of the British Empire